North Prairie Acres is an unincorporated community in Douglas County, Illinois, United States. North Prairie Acres is located to the immediate northeast of Tuscola.

References

Unincorporated communities in Douglas County, Illinois
Unincorporated communities in Illinois